The Olympus E-420 (or Olympus EVOLT E-420 in North America) is a 10 megapixel digital single-lens reflex (DSLR) camera made by Olympus. The camera conforms to the Four Thirds System standard, and together with its siblings in the E-4XX series, it is marketed as the smallest DSLR in the world.

Features
As with the E-400 (in Europe only) and E-410 before it, the E-420 is notable for its portability, especially when coupled with the simultaneously released Olympus 25mm f2.8 pancake lens. In addition to being based on the inherently more compact Four-Thirds system, its diminutive size is achieved by the use of a substantially smaller right hand grip than found on most dSLRs (similar to the grip design used on the E-400 and E-410, but with an added "ridge" for comfort and stability), as well as the continued exclusion of Olympus' well-known sensor-shift image stabilization from the package.

The E-420 uses Olympus' Supersonic Wave Filter to remove dust from the surface of the image sensor.

The E-420 was announced in March 2008 to replace the E-410, and shipping started two months later. In North America, it is marketed as the EVOLT E-420.

Advantages over the E-410 include Face Detection Technology for up to 8 faces, Imager AF (contrast-detect autofocus) in Live View mode with certain lenses (which provides 11 autofocus points as opposed to the usual 3), a redesigned grip, Shadow Adjustment Technology for greater perceived dynamic range, and wireless flash control for up to 3 flash units.

Storage

According to the official specification, the E-420 can accept up to an 8 GB CF memory card.

Gallery

References

External links 

Press release and Specifications from dpreview.com
E-420

E-420
Live-preview digital cameras
Four Thirds System